Mercedes Marín del Solar (September 11, 1804 - December 21, 1866) was a Chilean poet, school reformer, and women's rights activist.

Del Solar hosted a literary salon in her home and advocated for women's right to education in Chile.

References 

 Mercedes Marín del Solar (1804-1866). Obras reunidas. Compilación, estudio preliminar y notas críticas de Joyce Contreras Villalobos. Santiago: Centro de Investigaciones Diego Barros Arana/ DIBAM, 2015.

1804 births
1866 deaths
19th-century Chilean poets
Chilean salon-holders
Chilean feminists
Chilean women poets
19th-century Chilean women writers